Big Brother 21 is the twenty-first season of the American version of the television reality program Big Brother. The season premiered on June 25, 2019 and concluded on September 25, 2019. The 40-episode season was broadcast on CBS in the United States and Global in Canada.

Over the course of the season, the HouseGuests participated in a series of competitions to win power and safety to avoid being eliminated, referred to as "evicted". In the finale episode, previous nine evicted HouseGuests, known as the Jury, voted on who they thought should win the game out of the last two HouseGuests remaining. The HouseGuest who received the most votes would be declared the winner. Jackson Michie was declared the winner of the season in a 6–3 jury vote over Holly Allen while Nicole Anthony won the public vote for America's Favorite HouseGuest.

Despite receiving negative reviews from fans and critics, on September 5, 2019, CBS confirmed that the series was renewed for a twenty-second season.

Format 
Big Brother follows a group of contestants, known as HouseGuests, who live inside a custom-built house outfitted with cameras and microphones recording their every move 24 hours a day. The HouseGuests are sequestered with no contact with the outside world. During their stay, the HouseGuests share their thoughts on their day-to-day lives inside the house in a private room known as the Diary Room. Each week, the HouseGuests compete in competitions in order to win power and safety inside the house. At the start of each week, the HouseGuests compete in a Head of Household (abbreviated as "HOH") competition. The winner of the HoH competition is immune from eviction and  selects two HouseGuests to be nominated for eviction. Six HouseGuests are then selected to compete in the Power of Veto (abbreviated as "PoV") competition: the reigning HoH, the nominees, and three other HouseGuests chosen by random draw. The winner of the PoV competition has the right to either revoke the nomination of one of the nominated HouseGuests or leave them as is. If the veto winner uses this power, the HoH must immediately nominate another HouseGuest for eviction. The PoV winner is also immune from being named as the replacement nominee. On eviction night, all HouseGuests vote to evict one of the nominees, though the Head of Household and the nominees are not allowed to vote. This vote is conducted in the privacy of the Diary Room. In the event of a tie, the Head of Household casts the tie-breaking vote. The nominee with the most votes is evicted from the house. The last nine evicted HouseGuests comprise the Jury and are sequestered in a separate location following their eviction and ultimately decide the winner of the season. The Jury is only allowed to see the competitions and ceremonies that include all of the remaining HouseGuests; they are not shown any interviews or other footage that might include strategy or details regarding nominations. All evicted HouseGuests are eligible to win this award except for those who either voluntarily leave or are forcibly removed for rule violations.

HouseGuests 

On June 10, 2019, CBS reported that the cast would be revealed on June 17, 2019 on Big Brother live feeds to viewers with a CBS All Access subscription. Jeff Schroeder returned to host pre-season interviews with the cast after being replaced by Celebrity Big Brother alumnus Ross Mathews for the previous season.

Future appearances 
Jessica Milagros appeared on The Bold and the Beautiful on October 23, 2019. David Alexander and Nicole Anthony returned as contestants for Big Brother: All-Stars. Kathryn Dunn appeared on the fifth season of Ex on the Beach. David Alexander competed on The Challenge: USA. Analyse Talavera and Tommy Bracco competed on The Challenge: Ride or Dies as a team.

Episodes

Twists
Over the course of the game, several twists to the format were introduced.

Camp Director
On the first premiere night, Julie announced that the HouseGuests would vote for a Camp Director. That person would be safe from the first eviction as well, but they had to select four HouseGuests to "banish". Those four HouseGuests would then compete to stay in house. The three winners would go back into the house while the loser stayed banished and did not return. Michie was elected Camp Director and banished Cliff, David, Jessica, and Kemi. David lost the competition and was evicted.

Whacktivity Competition
On the second premiere night, Julie announced the Whacktivity Competition where a game-changing twist would be unleashed onto the house. Every week for the first three weeks, five designated HouseGuests, unless previously evicted (denoted with strikethrough text), would play in the competition to win a special power in the house.

Camp Comeback
During the first live eviction show, Julie announced to the audience that the first person voted out of the game would not go anywhere. After revealing Ovi's eviction, the HouseGuests were told that the evicted HouseGuest would not leave the house as normal, but live inside the house as part of Camp Comeback. At this time, David returned to the house. One of the first four HouseGuests to be eliminated would win their way back into the game. The evicted HouseGuests would not compete in competitions or ceremonies and would sleep in a special bedroom. The four HouseGuests, David, Ovi, Kemi, and Cliff, competed immediately after Cliff's eviction on Day 30. Cliff won and made his way back into the game, while David, Ovi, and Kemi were forced to immediately leave the house for good.

This twist also postponed Have-Nots as the Have-Not room was being used by the HouseGuests in Camp Comeback.

America's Field Trip
A twist called America's Field Trip was teased at the end of the July 25, 2019 eviction episode. On the August 1, 2019 eviction episode, it was revealed that America would vote for three HouseGuests who would compete against one another, with the winner being given immunity for the week, the runner-up being given a punishment and the loser being a third nominee. Should this third nominee be vetoed, no replacement nominee would be named, with only the HoH's two nominees facing the eviction vote. Voting for America's Field Trip opened shortly after the twist was revealed on the August 1, 2019. Voting closed on August 9, 2019, with the competition taking place shortly after. That same day, Analyse, Christie and Michie were voted in to competed in the competition. Michie won, meaning he was immune from eviction for that week. Analyse was the runner-up and received a punishment. Christie lost and was nominated as the third nominee.

Prank Week
During the eviction episode on August 23, it was revealed that Prank Week would take place during Week 9 in the House.

America's Prankster
The main feature of the week was America's Prankster twist. The HouseGuest voted as "America's Prankster" anonymously nominated one HouseGuest for eviction at the Nomination Ceremony, leaving the Head of Household with only one nomination. If their nominee is taken off the block by the Power of Veto, they will also anonymously name the replacement during the Veto Meeting. Holly, as Head of Household, was not eligible to be voted for America's Prankster. Voting opened for America's Prankster on August 22, 2019 at 6:30pm PT (9:30pm ET) and closed on August 23, 2019 at 9:00am PT (12:00pm ET). Nick won and, on Day 66, nominated Christie.

Other Pranks
Big Brother also played various pranks on the HouseGuests and the viewers during the week that did not affect the game. The pranks of Prank Week included:
 BB Birdwatching Tour: Big Brother made the HouseGuests stay up during the night with the "Big Brother Birdwatching Audio Tour" - which featured bird sounds and the names of birds. Big Brother intended to prank them by making the HouseGuests believe that the Audio Tour would be the subject matter for the next Head of Household competition and they would stay awake to remember the Audio Tour. It wasn't until the live Head of Household competition when the HouseGuests were told that the competition would not involve the bird sounds.
 Pie punishment: Cliff, Jessica, and Nicole got the lowest scores in the Head of Household competition and received a punishment. Periodically throughout the day or night, Big Brother would call Cliff, Jessica, and Nicole to make a pie and throw it in the face of either themselves or another HouseGuest.
 Interrupted sleep: Whether it be for the pie punishment or just to mess with the HouseGuests, Big Brother would wake HouseGuests in the middle of the night.
 Opening sequence: At the beginning of Wednesday's episode, the starting sequence showed videos and images from last season.
 Slimy Veto draw: At the Veto player draw, the box that held the HouseGuests' chips was full with slime, forcing Holly, Nick, and Christie to reach into the slime to pick the Veto players.
 Zingbot 9000: Zingbot — the robot programmed to roast HouseGuests - made his annual visit to the house to "zing" the Final 8 HouseGuests. He made his appearance on Day 67 for the Power of Veto competition.
 Clown spottings: Periodically on Day 69, Big Brother had clowns appear in the many windows around the House to scare the HouseGuests.

Voting history

Notes

 :  On Day 1, the HouseGuests were given the task of voting for a Camp Director. The HouseGuests were told that the Camp Director would receive immunity for the first week, but would be ineligible to compete in the first Head of Household competition. Michie was elected as Camp Director.
 : Michie had to "banish" four HouseGuests, who then competed in a challenge to stay in the house. Michie chose Cliff, David, Jessica and Kemi. David lost the competition was officially banished; Cliff, Jessica, and Kemi were able to re-enter the game.
 :  Instead of permanent eviction, David, Ovi, Kemi, and Cliff competed for an opportunity to come back into the game through the "Camp Comeback" twist.  Cliff won the competition on Day 30 and re-entered the game.
 :  Analyse, Christie, and Michie were selected by the viewers to participate in the America's Field Trip competition. Michie won and received immunity for the week. For finishing last, Christie was nominated as a third nominee, and her nomination did not require a replacement when the veto was used to save her.
 : America voted for Nick to be America's Prankster, who took half of Holly's Head of Household power by anonymously nominating Christie at the Nomination Ceremony. Nick was not immune and could have been nominated by Holly.
 : This was a Double Eviction Week. Following Jessica's eviction, the remaining HouseGuests played a week's worth of Big Brother, including HoH and Veto competitions, and nomination, veto and eviction ceremonies, during the live show, culminating in a second eviction for the week.
 : As Head of Household, Michie chose to evict Nicole.
 : During the finale, the Jury voted for the winner of Big Brother.

Production

Development 

CBS announced that Big Brother had been renewed for a twenty-first season on May 15, 2019. CBS later announced on May 20, 2019 that the twenty-first season was set to premiere on June 25, 2019. Unnamed insiders close to the production of the show previously cast doubt if Julie Chen Moonves would return to host following sexual misconduct allegations against her husband, former CBS CEO Les Moonves. Chen Moonves, however, returned for the second season of Celebrity Big Brother and it was later announced that she would return as host of the main series as well. Casting for the season was open until April 5, 2019. Allison Grodner and Rich Meehan returned as executive producers for the series which is produced by Fly on the Wall Entertainment, in association with Endemol Shine North America. The season featured an initial timeslot change from previous seasons; new episodes aired on a Sunday/Tuesday/Wednesday schedule through the first six episodes before returning to a traditional Sunday/Wednesday/Thursday schedule as in previous seasons. The 24/7 internet live feeds also returned with a CBS All Access subscription following the two-night season premiere on June 26. Big Brother: After Dark returned on Pop for its fourteenth season overall and fifth season on Pop following the two-night premiere on June 26 or June 27, depending on viewers local time zones. Off the Block with Ross and Marissa did not return for a second season as an aftershow interviewing HouseGuests after their eviction. Replacing Off the Block, Big Brother host Chen-Moonves hosted extended interviews with the evicted HouseGuests from outside the house.

Casting 
Kassting, Inc. returned to provide casting services for a twentieth consecutive season since Big Brother 2, with Robyn Kass serving as the casting director.

Filming 

As with previous seasons, the program is filmed at CBS Studios, soundstage 18 in Studio City, California in a custom-built two-story house. The House is equipped with 94 high-definition cameras and over 113 microphones to monitor and record the HouseGuests. The living room, three bedrooms, kitchen, dining room, bathroom and lounge room are located on the first floor. The Head of Household bedroom and bathroom and an additional lounge area known as the "Sky Bridge" are located on the second floor. The second floor is accessible by a ladder located in the entry way or a spiral staircase located in the kitchen next to the sliding glass doors that lead to the backyard. The backyard area features outdoor amenities for the HouseGuests. The house also features two diary rooms where the HouseGuests can privately share thoughts or send requests to producers of the series.

Production design 
The theme for this season is a summer camp called "Camp B.B." The house, competitions and twists were designed around the camp theme. Entertainment Tonight showed the first look at the house with Kevin Frazier during their episode on the night of June 20, 2019. Entertainment Tonight then released a sneak peek of the house through a brief tour on their website on June 21. Meanwhile, a full house tour with Chen Moonves and other photos were released through Big Brothers and CBS' social media outlets including Instagram, Twitter and Facebook. Big Brother 21 house theme matched the season's overall theme and received a camp theme; Production Designer Scott Storey designed the house's features. The living room features a birch-wood coffee table and a large and a 23-foot triangular window illuminated by LED lights. The first bedroom features a "sleeping under the stars" theme and includes two double-beds and the exterior of a camper. The camper, is only a facade into the second bedroom which features three double-beds and is assumed to be that of a camp counselors bedroom. The third and final downstairs bedroom is a sports-themed bedroom primarily based on archery. In the kitchen, many of the appliances have been redone in an attempt to blend them in with the rest of the theme, with an electronic campfire added to the center of the formal dining table. The downstairs lounge area received a boat theme, while the bathroom received a boat house-like theme. The upstairs lounge area, for the first time in the series history, is also accessible by a ladder from the entryway and has been updated to resemble a tree house; the Head of Household bedroom and bathroom have been changed to resemble a Moroccan-style bedroom and is expected to resemble glamping. The backyard features a pool with kayaks and an attached hot tub, lawn chairs surround the backyard which also features a pool table and a washer and dryer, workout equipment, outdoor lounge areas, a hammock and a mini-fridge.

Prizes 
The last remaining HouseGuest, Jackson Michie, received . The runner-up of the season, Holly Allen, received  while the HouseGuest deemed America's Favorite HouseGuest, Nicole Anthony, received . As part of a promotion for new CBS series Love Island, Sam Smith won a trip to Fiji in a Power of Veto competition. During another Power of Veto competition, Kathryn Dunn received a trip to Hawaii and Nick Maccarone was awarded . During a surprise luxury competition in Week 12, Michie won .

Reception
This season was the least-watched and lowest-rated season of the series with about a 20% decrease in viewers and 25% decrease in demographics from the previous season. The season ended with an average viewership per episode of 4.38 million, over one million fewer than the previous lowest. Despite the decrease in ratings, CBS announced on September 5, 2019 that Big Brother was renewed for its twenty-second and will premiere in the summer of 2020.

Controversy and criticism
Big Brother 21 was criticized negatively by critics and fans due to the HouseGuests' discriminatory tendencies. Professor of African American studies and the UCLA Dean of Social Sciences, Darnell Hunt, stated, "Race is the central axis of social relationships. Even when, in public, we try to deny its significance, it creeps through in unexpected ways. When people are in a house like that 24 hours a day under those conditions, it's difficult to hide an inconvenient truth about American culture and society. The camera is the great equalizer." However, the way CBS handled the situations was somewhat praised by viewers as they dedicated a time during the live finale to address them and let the HouseGuests explain themselves. Justin Carriero of The Young Folks wrote, "These HouseGuests got away with a lot and they avoided the blowback by being in jury, so they had no idea what storm was heading their way. They needed to know what they did and how the public viewed them." He ended up rating the finale an eight on a scale from one to ten. Overall, the season was criticized for its non-diverse casting, leniency with specific rules like Have-Not rules, and deceptive editing of the episodes compared to the events shown on the 24/7 Live Feeds.

Racial optics
Following the two-night season premiere, HouseGuest Jackson Michie received the "Camp Director" power and was required to choose four HouseGuests to banish. Michie chose David Alexander and Kemi Fakunle, the season's only two black HouseGuests, Jessica Milagros, a Latina plus-size model and Cliff Hogg, the oldest person in the house. But, other viewers suggested that Michie only picked Fakunle due to lack of communication and that Alexander, Milagros and Hogg were only picked because they competed against him for the position of Camp Director.  Once the Live Feeds began, Jack Matthews started making obscene and prejudiced remarks about fellow HouseGuests Kemi Fakunle, Ovi Kabir, and Jessica Milagros, behind their backs. Matthews was warned by production about comments made and to prevent further such comments. Many of his comments were addressed in episode 20 during his post-eviction interview with Julie Chen Moonves where he denied racism being behind any of the comments, though he did apologize for his actions that were deemed offensive.

Week 3 incident
During Week 3, an incident involving the dominant "Gr8ful" alliance, which was partially shown during episode 10, was sharply criticized by the viewing audience. The incident started when Nicole Anthony confided in Isabella Wang, telling her that the majority alliance, spearheaded by Jack Matthews and Jackson Michie, would come after Wang and Nick Maccarone, but Wang, who was included in this majority alliance with Maccarone, immediately told the group about it. The alliance swiftly denied Anthony's idea that they would target the couple despite earlier conversations where they discussed targeting them. The group proceeded to speak very negatively of Anthony. This incident was brought back up during the live finale to give the HouseGuests a chance to talk about the matter.

Have-Not cheating
During Week 4, Cliff Hogg, the then Head of Household, named Jackson Michie as one of the Have-Nots for the week. Despite being named as a Have-Not, Michie was seen on the Live Feeds breaking the Have-Not rules by eating prohibited food behind the shower wall out of camera view. Michie received no punishment normally given to HouseGuests who break the Have-Not rules. After this incident, the Have-Nots aspect of the game was not included for the remainder of the season.

Statements from CBS

At the 2019 Television Critics Association, CBS executives were questioned about diversity and racism issues on Big Brother. In an open interview with CBS executives, Big Brother was accused of giving "contestants of color unfair cuts or early eliminations" as well as editing out comments by HouseGuests that have been interpreted as racist. CBS executives defended editors of the show stating that it's difficult to edit days worth of content into 40 minutes. CBS executives also stated that they would "closely reexamine Big Brother 21 and see if we can do better next year."

Viewing figures

United States

Canada

References

External links
  – official American site
  – official Canadian site
 

2019 American television seasons
21